Panattoni Development Company is an international real estate developer specializing in industrial real estate and warehouses. It has 35 Full Service Development offices in across the United States, Europe and Canada. The company has delivered over 444 million square feet across these markets since inception, including 12 million square meters of warehouse space in Europe.
The company was founded in 1986 in the USA by Carl Panattoni. In the following years, Panattoni expanded its presence in the United States, Canada, Great Britain, Poland and other European countries. For example, in September 2021, Panattoni struck a deal to lease a 346,000 sq ft speculative warehouse in Luton, UK, to Ocado Retail (an online retailer and 50:50 joint venture between Marks & Spencer Group and Ocado Group).

External links 
 Panattoni Development Company
 Panattoni in Europe
 Panattoni in Poland

References

Real estate companies of the United States
Real estate companies established in 1986
Real estate companies of Canada
Companies based in California
Companies based in Newport Beach, California
1986 establishments in California
1986 establishments in the United States